Incarnate Word Cardinals basketball may refer to either of the basketball teams that represent the University of the Incarnate Word:

Incarnate Word Cardinals men's basketball
Incarnate Word Cardinals women's basketball